Elections to Chorley Borough Council were held on 1 May 2003.  One third of the council was up for election and the council stayed under no overall control.

After the election, the composition of the council was:

Election result

Results Map

Ward results

Adlington and Anderton ward

Astley and Buckshaw ward

Chisnall

Chorley East

Chorley North East

Chorley North West

Chorley South East

Chorley South West

Clayton le Woods and Whittle-le-Woods ward

Clayton le Woods North ward

Clayton le Woods West and Cuerden

Coppull

Eccleston and Mawdesley ward

Euxton South ward

Lostock

References
2003 Chorley election result
BOROUGH ELECTION RESULTS - MAY 2003

2003 English local elections
2003
2000s in Lancashire